Megan Shanahan (born 29 November 1985) is a female rugby union player. She represented  at the 2010 Women's Rugby World Cup, finishing third.

She teaches at Dubbo Senior College Campus.

References

1985 births
Living people
Australia women's international rugby union players
Australian female rugby union players
Rugby union flankers
20th-century Australian women
21st-century Australian women